The Bhil Garasia are a clan of the Bhil ethnic community and are found in the state of Rajasthan, India.

References 

Scheduled Tribes of Rajasthan
Bhil clans